The Vecekrugas Dune also called the Vecekrugas Hill is a forested dune on the Curonian Spit, Lithuania  south of Preila.

The formation of the whole Curonian Spit dune ridge started in the 16–17th centuries due to massive deforestation. Blown by the sea wind, the sands started moving from the Baltic Sea inland, burying forests and villages. Eventually, locals started fighting the sand with barriers and planting of trees and grass. Today, Vecekrugas Dune is covered by mountain pines. The trees have been planted there since the mid-19th century with seedlings brought from Denmark. This serves as a good example of sand dune stabilization.

There is an observation deck at the top of the dune with the views of the lagoon, the sea, and the pine forests of Nida and Preila.

References

Neringa Municipality
Landforms of Lithuania
Dunes of Europe